Mike Genovese (born Peter Michael Genovese on April 26, 1942 in St. Louis, Missouri) is an American actor.

Career
Genovese was born and raised in St. Louis, Missouri to an Italian American family. Genovese earned a master's degree in drama at Eastern Illinois University and taught acting at Webster College from 1969 to 1973 before devoting himself to work as actor in Washington, D.C., where he met his future wife, TV/film actress Ellen Crawford, Chicago, and later Los Angeles.

A character actor known for playing heavies, Genovese has appeared in many films such as two Richard Pryor billed vehicles, Jo Jo Dancer, Your Life Is Calling (1986) and Harlem Nights, which also co-starred Eddie Murphy, Redd Foxx and Della Reese, and guest roles on TV series such as The Dukes of Hazzard, The Paper Chase, Star Trek: The Next Generation, Family Matters, NYPD Blue, Quantum Leap, Arli$$, ER, Chicago Hope, and JAG. In 1990 he was a cast member in the short lived series “The Flash” where he played Lt. Warren Garfield. For ER, the long-running medical drama which aired on NBC, Genovese appeared in a recurring role as Officer Al Grabarsky, where he appeared opposite his real life wife, Crawford, who was as cast regular as Nurse Lydia Wright, his character's girlfriend. He appeared in twelve episodes of the series from 1994 through 2000.

Theater roles
In 1979, Genovese had a performance as Philip Marlowe at Chicago's Organic Theater in Stuart Gordon directed adaptation of Raymond Chandler's "The Little Sister." In 2005, he appeared as Rev. Tollhouse in The Book of Liz play by Amy Sedaris and David Sedaris at the 2nd Stage Theatre, Hollywood.

References

External links 
 

1942 births
American male stage actors
American male film actors
American male television actors
Male actors from St. Louis
Eastern Illinois University alumni
American people of Italian descent
Living people